Tony Oludewa Skinn (born February 8, 1983) is a NigerianAmerican basketball coach and former player. He played guard for the George Mason University Patriots from 2003–2006, later playing professionally for six years. Skinn is currently an assistant coach for the University of Maryland men's basketball team. Born in Lagos, Nigeria, Skinn migrated with his family to the United States at the age of two.

College career
In his senior season, Skinn averaged 12.6 points, 3.5 rebounds, and 2.8 assists per game. The season was marked by the Patriots' surprising run to the Final Four.  He scored a season-high 23 points and hit the game-winning three-point shot with 10.8 seconds left, in GMU's ESPN BracketBusters game against Wichita State on February 18, 2006, ultimately landing the Patriots in the USA Today/ESPN Top 25 for the first time in school history. The Patriots posted a 23-7 record during the regular season, and while they did not win the 2006 CAA men's basketball tournament title, they were awarded the program's first at-large bid as an 11 seed.

In GMU's run to the Final Four, Skinn scored eight points against defending champion North Carolina in the second round, 14 points in a rematch against Wichita State in the Sweet Sixteen, 10 points against top-seeded UConn in the Elite Eight, and 14 points against eventual back-to-back tournament winners Florida Gators.

After GMU's Elite Eight victory, Skinn told reporters that Coach Jim Larranaga fired up his players by telling them that UConn's players did not even know what conference the Patriots came from. "That's a little bit of disrespect," Skinn recounted. "Coach told us the CAA stands for the 'Connecticut Assassin Association'."

Professional career
In 2006, Skinn signed a contract to play with the Croatian club Split, of the Adriatic League, after he wasn't drafted in the 2006 NBA Draft.

In July 2007, Skinn was invited to play for the Orlando Magic at the Orlando Summer League. In July 2008, he signed with Gravelines Dunkerque Basket in the French Pro A league, recording team-highs of 16.6 points per game, 3.8 assists per game, and shooting 43% from 3PT range.

On August 5, 2009, he signed with Pistoia Basket of the Italian Second Division. On October 1, 2010, Skinn signed with the New Yorker Phantoms of the German League. He then played with Ironi Ashkelon in the Israeli League.

Nigerian national team
On July 8, 2012, the Nigerian national basketball team defeated the Dominican Republic, to earn the last spot in the 2012 Summer Olympics. As the starting point guard for the team, Skinn averaged 10.0 points per game in the FIBA Olympic qualifiers. In the game against the United States national team, Nigeria lost the game by 83 points, 156-73. It was the largest deficit by a losing team and a new Olympic record for most points scored in a game by the United States. While the Nigerian national team's performance was less than favorable, Skinn was the catalyst for arguably the most memorable highlight during the 2012 Olympic tournament against the United States' guard James Harden.

Coaching career

Seton Hall

After spending three seasons as an assistant coach for the Louisiana Tech Bulldogs men's basketball team, Skinn was hired by Kevin Willard to be an assistant coach for the Seton Hall Pirates in the Big East Conference.

Ohio State

On May 20, 2021, after spending three seasons at Seton Hall, Skinn was hired as an assistant coach at Ohio State, replacing Terry Johnson.

Maryland

On March 23, 2022 Skinn was hired as an assistant coach at the University of Maryland reuniting him with Kevin Willard for whom he served under as an assistant previously with at Seton Hall.

https://247sports.com/college/ohio-state/Article/Tony-Skinn-leaves-Ohio-State-basketball-to-become-assistant-coach-at-Maryland-Terrapins-184916216/

References

External links
Eurobasket.com profile
French League profile 
Adriatic League profile
Official George Mason College bio
College stats

1983 births
Living people
African-American basketball players
American expatriate basketball people in Croatia
American expatriate basketball people in France
American expatriate basketball people in Germany
American expatriate basketball people in Italy
American expatriate basketball people in Ukraine
American sportspeople of Nigerian descent
Basketball Löwen Braunschweig players
Basketball players at the 2012 Summer Olympics
Basketball players from Maryland
Blinn Buccaneers men's basketball players
George Mason Patriots men's basketball players
Ironi Ashkelon players
KK Split players
Louisiana Tech Bulldogs basketball coaches
Nigerian expatriate basketball people in France
Nigerian expatriate basketball people in Germany
Nigerian expatriate basketball people in Italy
Nigerian men's basketball players
Olympic basketball players of Nigeria
People from Takoma Park, Maryland
Pistoia Basket 2000 players
Point guards
Seton Hall Pirates men's basketball coaches
Shooting guards
Sportspeople from Lagos
Sportspeople from Montgomery County, Maryland
American men's basketball players
21st-century African-American sportspeople
20th-century African-American people